NGC 6212 is a spiral galaxy located in the constellation Hercules. It is designated as Sb in the galaxy morphological classification scheme and was discovered by the French astronomer Édouard Stephan on 26 July 1870. NGC 6212 is located at about 397 million light years from Earth.

See also 
 List of NGC objects (6001–7000)

References

External links 
 

Unbarred spiral galaxies
Hercules (constellation)
6212
58840
Discoveries by Édouard Stephan